"Ridin' Solo" is the third single from Jason Derulo's self-titled debut album, produced by J.R. Rotem. The demo originally sampled "Bitter Sweet Symphony" by the Verve, but the sample was not cleared and was subsequently replaced with electronic motifs which are featured throughout the entire song.

On May 16, 2010, "Ridin' Solo" became Derulo's third consecutive top three hit on the UK Singles Chart. It is his third consecutive number-one hit on the UK R&B Chart and third consecutive top ten hit on the US Billboard Hot 100.

Critical reception
The song has received generally mixed reviews from critics. Fraser McAlpine of BBC Chart Blog gave the song a rating of three stars out of five and went to say that "Jason clearly doesn't have a lisp, his sibilants hiss out from every other word in the song. And he delivers them all perfectly. Nice work otherwise.

Idolator said that "Derulo knows how to get the public interested in the hip-hop star again—follow every trend there is". Robert Copsey from Digital Spy gave "Ridin' Solo" three out of five stars and wrote that it "is still another catchy, engaging effort that should keep Derulo near the top on both sides of the pond".

Chart performance
As of April 23, 2014 the single has sold over 3 million digital copies in the US, making it Derulo's third consecutive song to sell more than 3 million copies.

Music video
The music video for "Ridin' Solo" was released on May 2, 2010, directed by Scott Speer. The video depicts Derulo singing about being single after breaking up with his girlfriend. In the first 15 seconds of the video, Derulo is playing a piano and singing "Blind", which is a track of his debut album, with a photo of his ex-girlfriend on the top of the piano. Derulo features in several scenes shot at Lot 613, including one in a nightclub, several in a Honda CR-Z and his dancing, (at times with backup dancers) on a moving floor (which are actually hidden conveyor belts) in front of a big, colorful LED screen flashing and glowing, sometimes reading "Solo" in block letters. Derulo wears a white jacket with spikes on the sleeves throughout the video in different scenes.

In one of the nightclub scenes filmed at Lot 613, a group of girls are seen to be chatting on PlentyofFish (an Internet dating website) on an iPad which was first released.
There is a slight difference between the music video and the album version of the song; in the video the line "You told me get my shit together, now I got my shit together, oh"  uncensored on the track is replaced by "You told me get myself together, now I got myself together, oh". Some areas of the instrumental have also been altered slightly and it is a few seconds shorter than the album version. This version is also used on many radio stations across the UK. Another radio edit exists which is similar to the video version, except it mutes the explicit lyrics rather than just replace them with other words.

Covers
In April 2012, "Ridin' Solo" was covered by MC Chris and included on his 2012 mixtape Apple Lung with the lyrics changed to "I'm Han Solo", a song created for the 2012 video game Kinect Star Wars, which inspired Aaron Fraser-Nash's own parody in 2018. The Station parodied "Ridin' Solo" on YouTube as "No Homo".

Track listing
CD maxi single
 "Ridin' Solo"
 "Ridin' Solo" (Acoustic Version)
 "Ridin' Solo" (Justin Michael & Kemal Remix)
 "Ridin' Solo" (Eddie Amador Club)	
 "Ridin' Solo" (Mig & Rizzo POP Mix)
 "Ridin' Solo" (Video)

Ridin' Solo EP
 "Ridin' Solo" (Acoustic Version) – 3:44
 "Ridin' Solo" (Eddie Amador Club) – 7:59
 "Ridin' Solo" (Justin Michael & Kemal Remix) – 6:17
 "Ridin' Solo" (Ian Nieman Club Mix) – 6:58

7th Heaven Remix
 "Ridin' Solo" (7th Heaven Club Mix) - 6:42
 "Ridin' Solo" (7th Heaven Radio Edit) - 3:21

Promo CD single
 "Ridin' Solo" – 3:24

Charts and certifications

Weekly charts

Year-end charts

Certifications

Release history

References

2010 songs
2010 singles
Jason Derulo songs
Song recordings produced by J. R. Rotem
Songs written by J. R. Rotem
Music videos directed by Scott Speer
Songs written by Jason Derulo
Warner Records singles
Warner Music Group singles